The 130 mm towed field gun M-46 is a manually loaded, towed 130 mm artillery piece, manufactured in the Soviet Union in the 1950s. It was first observed by the west in 1954.

Design history
The order was given in April 1946 to design a "duplex" artillery pice to replace the obsolete 122 mm gun M1931/37 (A-19), 152 mm howitzer-gun M1937 (ML-20) and other World War II era field guns, such as 122 mm Model 1931, 152 mm Model 1910/30, 152 mm Model 1935 (BR-2). The new pieces, designed by the factory No 172 (MOTZ), shared the same carriage and were given the designators M-46 (130 mm) and M-47 (152 mm). The respective GRAU designators are 52-P-482 and 52-P-547. The development phase was finished in 1950 and one year later, series production began. Many M-46s were exported.

A second "duplex" artillery system was subsequently designed by FF Petrov's design bureau at Artillery Factory No 9. This comprised a 122 mm gun and a 152 mm howitzer. The D-74 122 mm field gun was a competitor to the M-46; and while many were produced, the M-46 became the only long range gun in Soviet service until new 152 mm guns were made in the 1970s.

Description

The M-46 was developed from the M-36 130 mm naval gun used on ships and for coast defence. It is a true gun, being unable to fire much above 45° and having a long barrel and a single propelling charge. In contrast, most Western field guns of this period had a dual high and low angle fire ability, a gun-howitzer.

It has a 39 calibre barrel with a tied jaw horizontal sliding-block breech and 'pepperpot' muzzle brake. The latter is not notably efficient, but subjective reports suggest that it is quite effective in reducing muzzle flash. The hydro-pneumatic recoil system comprises a buffer below the barrel and a recuperator above the barrel. The long barrel enables a substantial propelling charge by providing more length in which to achieve 'all-burnt' and hence projectile acceleration space and thus achieve its 930 m/s muzzle velocity.

The barrel is mounted on a split-trail carriage, with deep box section trails and foam filled road wheels on the ground when firing and 50° of top traverse. The small shield protects little more than the sights, possible including from the effects of muzzle blast, and some protection from machine gun fire in anti-tank engagements. The gun has long and robust trails to provide stability when firing, a large detachable spade is fitted to the end of each when the gun is brought into action.

Non-reciprocating sights are standard Soviet pattern, designed for one-man laying. Included are a direct fire anti-tank telescope, a panoramic periscopic indirect-fire sight (a dial sight) in a reciprocating mounting, an angle of sight scale, and a range drum engraved with the range (distance) scale, coupled to a mounted elevation levelling bubble. The range drum enables the standard Soviet technique of semi-direct fire when the piece is laid visually on the target and the range set on the range drum. An APN-3 was later provided for direct fire at night in place of the day telescope.

For travel, the gun is towed via a two-wheeled limber fitted to the end of the closed trails, with the spades removed and carried on each trail. Simple jacks on the trails just behind the main wheels are used to lift and support the closed trails so that the limber can be connected. The barrel and recuperator are pulled back between the closed trails and locked in a travelling position. There is a large bicycle chain arrangement on the right trail for this, and a compressed air cylinder, charged by the gun firing, is used to bring the barrel forward when the gun is brought back into action. It takes about four minutes to bring the gun into action, the normal detachment is eight strong.

Propelling charges are in metal cartridge cases and loaded separately from the projectile. Projectiles originally included HE fragmentation, Armour Piercing solid shot, smoke, illuminating and chemical. HE shells weigh ~. Illuminating shells have a substantially lower muzzle velocity. APHE and extended range shells were introduced later. Maximum rate of fire is probably 6-7 rounds/minute, and about 70 rounds/hour. The standard Soviet unit of fire was 80 rounds.

Operational history

The M-46 was first seen openly at the 1954 May Day Parade in Moscow. It initially replaced the 100 mm BS-3 field and anti-tank gun. However, its long range made it well suited for counter-battery actions. There are reports of poor fragmentation. Its Soviet use with an integrated fire-control system including SNAR-2 radars has also been reported. In Soviet service, M-46 battalions were in Army and Front artillery brigades.

It is or has been in service with at least 25 countries and has been license manufactured in China as the Type 59. It was replaced in Soviet/Russian inventory by the 2A36 Giatsint-B and the self-propelled 2S5 Giatsint-S. Several companies, like Soltam and RDM Technology BV, have presented upgrade packages for the gun. These include, for instance, an upgrade to a 45 caliber 155 mm gun. Its long range made it especially useful in the Vietnam War.

The M-46 saw extensive combat service with the People's Armed Forces for the Liberation of Angola (FAPLA) during the Angolan Civil War and South African Border War. From the mid to late 1970s Angolan M-46s were deployed with some success in the counter-battery role against South African artillery units, which possessed comparatively short-ranged BL 5.5-inch medium guns. South Africa later acquired six M-46s from Israel for evaluation purposes; this likely influenced its development of the G5 howitzer, which was adopted to counter the range and effectiveness of the FAPLA field guns. Cuba also deployed M-46 batteries of its own in support of FAPLA operations during its lengthy military intervention in Angola. Cuban and FAPLA M-46s were used most notably during the Battle of Cuito Cuanavale, where individual guns were deployed in ones or twos rather than concentrated in single positions to reduce the threat posed by counter-battery fire from South African G5s. Cuban tacticians were able to repeatedly stall a South African mechanized and armored offensive by using minefields to channel the attackers into bottlenecks where the M-46s could concentrate their fire.

Tanzania People's Defence Force fielded some M-46 guns during Uganda–Tanzania War in 1978–1979.

A version of this gun, possibly the Chinese-manufactured Type 59-1, is suspected to have been used by North Korea for shelling the South Korean island of Yeonpyeong in the Yellow Sea on 23 November 2010.

Variants

Soviet Union
 M-47 – This is a 152 mm field gun that was developed alongside the M-46. The M-47 had a range of 20,470 m and was far less successful than its 130 mm counterpart. Only a small number was built between 1954 and 1957. Externally, the M-46 and M-47 are virtually identical, except for the calibre.

China

 Type 59 – This is a licensed version of the M-46.
 Type 59-1 – This is a combination of the 130 mm ordnance of the Type 59 with the carriage of the Type 60 (D-74 copy). The result is a gun with the same range as the M-46, but with a much lower weight of 6.3 t. The M59-1M is the Egyptian licence version. For the export market, a version with APU and redesigned carriage was developed. Also for the export market, a self-propelled variant, based on the Type 83 SPH was designed.
 Type GM-45 – For the export market, NORINCO (China North Industries Corporation) developed this upgrade package where the original barrel of the Type 59 is replaced by the 155/45 mm ordnance of the WA 021. The Type GM-45 has a maximum range of 39 km when ERFB-BB ammunition is used.

Cuba
 The Cuban army operates two different, locally designed self-propelled versions of the M-46. One is based on the tracked chassis of the T-34-85 tank, while the other is based on a heavily modified KrAZ 6x6 truck. These and other modifications were shown for the first time during the 2006 military parade.

Egypt
 The Egyptian Army operates a locally assembled variant of the M-46

India
 The Indian Army has a total of around 1000 of the 130 mm towed guns that were acquired from the former Soviet Union starting in 1968.
 Upgunned Soltam 155 mm guns – A total of 180 of the 130 mm guns held by Indian Army were upgunned to 155 calibre by the Israeli firm Soltam in 2008.

 IOB Sharang 155 mm/45 calibre guns – Another 155 mm upgrade (45 Calibre) upgrade of the 300 M-46 towed guns, this one designed by Ordnance Factory Board (OFB). The upgraded M-46 has a range of 39 km. India's Ministry of Defence (MoD) has awarded an INR2 billion (US$27.2 million) contract on 25 October 2018 to the state-owned Ordnance Factory Board (OFB) to upgrade 300 of the Indian Army's (IA's) Soviet-era 130 mm/52 calibre M-46 field guns to 155 mm/45 calibre in a bid to augment its firepower.

 SP-130 "Catapult" – Indian-designed self-propelled version, mounted on the hull of the Vijayanta tank.

Israel
 M-46S – This is an upgrade of an existing M-46 or Type 59, carried out by Soltam Systems Ltd. The original barrel is replaced by a new model of 155/45mm (western ammunition) for a range of 25.8 (HE) to 39 km (ERFB-BB). A 39-calibre barrel is optional. In March 2000, Soltam won a contract worth $47,524,137 for upgrading 180 M-46s to M-46S standard (Indian designator: 155/45mm (E1) Soltam). A follow-on deal for 250 retrofit kits was optioned for. In 2005, after only 40 howitzers were modified, the M-46S programme was terminated due to a fatal barrel explosion.

Democratic People's Republic of Korea
The US Defense Intelligence Agency has reported the existence of a number of locally designed self-propelled artillery systems, including the SPG 130 mm M1975, the SPG 130 mm M1981 and the SPG 130 mm M1991. Details are not available, but they appear to be M-46/Type 59s mounted on a tracked chassis “Tokchon”.

Serbia
 M46/84 – This is a conversion that involved replacing the original 130 mm barrel with a new 155/45 mm barrel or 152 mm barrel. With ERFB-BB ammunition, this version has a range of 38,600 m and with M05 152 mm range exceeds 40 km.

Netherlands
 RDM Technology BV is yet another company that offers an upgrade of the M-46/Type 59 that involves fitting a new 155mm/45 barrel.

Romania
 A412 – License-built Chinese Type 59-1 with D-20 carriage. In Romanian Army service, the A412 is known as the 130 mm towed gun M1982. The A412 was also exported.
Type 59-1 was manufactured by Arsenal Resita under the designation A412 Model 1982 between 1982 and 1989. The A412 cannon can fire a 7-8 rounds per minute. The A412 was exported to four other countries: Bosnia-Herzegovina, Cameroon, Guinea, and Nigeria.

Vietnam 
 PTH130-K225B – A self-propelled prototype placed on KrAZ 6x6 truck was revealed, based on Cuba's variant.

Projectiles
 Frag-HE, 3OF33 (with full charge 3VOF43) – range: 27,490 meters
 Frag-HE, 3OF33 (with separate charge 3VOF44) – range: 22,490 meters
 Frag-HE, ERFB-BB – Extended Range Full Bore – Base Bleed, range: 38,000 meters
 APCBC-HE-T, BR-482 and BR-482B – range: 1,140 meters
 Guided Shell, Firn-1 – range: 24,000 meters
 Smoke
 Chemical
 Illumination

Operators

 : 10
 : 146 acquired from the Soviet Union and Bulgaria; 48 in service
 : 36 acquired from Bulgaria.
 : 62; Type 59-1 variant
 : 8; A412 variant
 : Type 59-1s
 : 12 A412 variant and 12 Type 59 variant
 : 234 in service in 2016; Type 59 and Type 59-1 variants
 : 5
 : 42; Type 59 and Type-59-1 variants
 : 197
 : 650; 250 M-46 and 400 Type 59-1M
 : 39 acquired from Bulgaria 19 in service.
 : 114
 Tigray Liberation Front
 : 12; A412 variant
 : 6, IISS questions their serviceability 
 : ~600 in service and ~500 in store; 200 modified to 155 mm caliber
 : 726; 100 M-46 and 626 Type 59; another estimate gives 985 M-46s
 : 676; M-46 and Type 59 variants.
 : Captured from Syria and Egypt.
 : 10
 : 15-16
 : 330
 : 50
 : 18 Donated by Egypt in the late 1970's
 : 24 6 in service in 2016.
 : 16 Type 59-1 and 160 M-46 in service
 : 4; A412 variant; another estimate gives 7 M-46s
 : 210; 160 M-46 and 50 Type 59
 : 15 acquired from unidentified source. Other source gives 12 M-46s and 12 Type 59-1s.
 : 360; 100 M-46 and 260 Type 59; another estimate gives 410 Type 59-1s in service in 2016
 : 30 to 36
 : 75; A412 variant
 : 650
 : 18
 
 : 12 to 30; Type 59 or Type 59-1 variant
 : 30 to 75; Type 59 variant
 : 650
  Free Syrian Army
 : 30 to 50; Type 59-1 variant
 : 54; Type 59 variant
 : 6 acquired from Bulgaria.
 : 24 (M-46H1 variant) provided by Croatia in 2022. 
 : 20; Type 59-1 variant
 : 519
 : 18; Type 59 variant

Former Operators

 
 : 428
 : 100; Type 59 variant
 : 72
 : 36; M-46H1 variant
 : 175
 : 144 acquired from the Soviet Union in 1965-66 and 166 from ex-East-Germany in 1993; in 2016, 36 were still in service under designation 130 K 54, all withdrawn from active service in 2019
 : Former East German guns; 166 sold to Finland in 1993
 : 34
 Liberation Tigers of Tamil Eelam: 12; Type 59-1
 : 10 acquired from East Germany
 : 30
 : 10; Type 59 variant
 : 6 on loan from Israel, later returned
South Lebanon Army: 5 acquired from Israel
 : 93 received; ~60 in service in 2016
 : 186

See also
 180 mm gun S-23

References

External links

 M-46
 Type 59 130mm towed gun
 https://www.youtube.com/watch?v=Abjk1QlDQQM Finnish 130 K 154 Training

130 mm artillery
Field artillery of the Cold War
Artillery of the Soviet Union
Motovilikha Plants products
Military equipment introduced in the 1950s